Carol E. Cass is a Canadian research scientist. From 2003 to 2010, Cass served as director of Alberta's Cross Cancer Institute. She is Canada Research Chair in oncology at the University of Alberta and was elected a Fellow of the Royal Society of Canada and Canadian Academy of Health Sciences.

Personal life
Cass was born in Oklahoma to a physician father and homemaker mother. She earned her Bachelor of Science and Master of Science degrees at the University of Oklahoma and her PhD at the University of California at Berkeley.

In 1990, Cass was diagnosed with meningioma, a type of brain tumour. As a result, her eye had to be replaced with a prosthetic in February 2011.

Career
In 1970, Cass came to the University of Alberta with her husband, who was hired for a position in Botany, and conducted her postdoctoral with Alan Paterson.  From there, Cass became the only female professor in the University's Department of Biochemistry and the first female chair of the National Cancer Institute of Canada’s (NCIC) Advisory Committee on Research. In 1996, Cass was appointed chair of the University of Alberta’s Department of Oncology and Associate Director of Research at the Cross.

In 2000, Cass and Dr. Amira Klip shared the honor of CSMB Jeanne Manery Fisher Memorial Lecture Award. In 2002, Cass was elected a Fellow of the Royal Society of Canada. A year later, Cass was also elected to serve as the Director of the Cross Cancer Institute. While serving in these roles, Cass was selected to serve on the Ministry of Economic Development, Job Creation and Trade Premier's Discovery Awards panel. She was also awarded the J. Gordon Kaplan Award for Excellence in Research in 2008.

During her career at the University of Alberta, Cass was elected a Fellow of the Canadian Academy of Health Sciences. In 2010, Cass left her position as Director of the Cross Cancer Institute. In 2015, Cass was elected to sit on the LA Opera board.

Research
She is recognized as an expert on nucleosides, a class of anti-cancer drugs.  Her research has led to the more effective use of nucleoside drugs and the development of new treatments for patients with acute and chronic leukemias, lymphomas, and cancers of the lung, bladder, breast and pancreas. She determined that nucleoside-based drugs are able to cross cell membranes by binding to specialized transporter proteins. The drugs are able to enter and directly attack cancer cells during the binding process.

Awards 
 2006, awarded the Robert L. Noble Prize by the National Cancer Institute of Canada for her contributions to cancer research.
 Fellow of the Royal Society of Canada and Canadian Academy of Health Sciences
 2018, Alberta Medical Association Medal of Honor.

References

Canadian medical researchers
Cancer researchers
Living people
Canada Research Chairs
Canadian women academics
Fellows of the Royal Society of Canada
Fellows of the Canadian Academy of Health Sciences
Year of birth missing (living people)
University of Oklahoma alumni
University of California, Berkeley alumni